This is a partial list of published short-story authors:

A–B

C–D

E–F

G–H

I–J

K–L

M–N

O–R

S–T

U–Z

References

Short-story authors